The 1935 Irish Greyhound Derby took place during August with the final being held at Shelbourne Park in Dublin on August 10.

The winner Roving Yank was owned by Billy Dunne.

Final result 
At Shelbourne Park, 10 August (over 525 yards):

Distances
6 (lengths)

Competition Report
In the first two semi-finals on 3 August Roving Spring beat his half-brother Roving Yank in a time of 30.46 and Tullyglass Bramble won by two lengths from Lisnagree in 30.60. On 5 August Received With Thanks and Swift Brown Lady took the remaining two final places. The final resulted in an easy win for Roving Yank leading early and stretching his lead to six lengths at the finish. Tullyglass Bramble finished well to take third place behind Roving Spring in second place.

See also
 1935 UK & Ireland Greyhound Racing Year

References

Greyhound Derby
Irish Greyhound Derby